This is a list of all songs recorded by Righeira.

Songs

See also 

 Righeira discography

References 

 
Righeira
Righeira